Clubiona silvestris is a species of spiders in the family Clubionidae (sac spiders), found in Borneo. It was first described by Christa Deeleman-Reinhold in 2001.

References

Clubionidae
Spiders of Asia
Spiders described in 2001